Stenogomphurus is a genus of clubtails in the family of dragonflies known as Gomphidae. There are at least two described species in Stenogomphurus, both found in North America.

Stenogomphurus was formerly considered a subgenus of Gomphus, but has recently been promoted to genus rank along with Phanogomphus, Gomphurus and Hylogomphus.

Species
These two species belong to the genus Stenogomphurus:
 Stenogomphurus consanguis (Selys, 1879) (Cherokee clubtail)
 Stenogomphurus rogersi (Gloyd, 1936) (sable clubtail)

References

Further reading

 
 
 
 
 
 
 

Gomphidae